Anri Kawamura (born 15 October 2004) is a Japanese freestyle skier specializing in moguls. She started competing internationally in December 2019. Kawamura won three World Cup races in the 2021-22 season and qualified for the 2022 Winter Olympics. Kawamura was leading the moguls standings in the 2021–22 season at the start of the Olympics, after 7 of 8 races. As of mid-January 2022, at the age of 17, she achieved 10 podium finishes in 23 career starts. At the 2022 Olympics, she qualified for Final C (the medal round), but only finished fifth.

Olympics results

References

External links

Living people
Japanese female freestyle skiers
Freestyle skiers at the 2022 Winter Olympics
Olympic freestyle skiers of Japan
2004 births
21st-century Japanese women